Howrah Maidan can refer to:

 a district of the city of Howrah, India
 Howrah Maidan metro station, a station of the Kolkata Metro in the above district

Kolkata Metropolitan Area